Carex flavocuspis is a tussock-forming species of perennial sedge in the family Cyperaceae. It is native to northern and central parts of Japan, northern parts of China and far eastern parts of Russia.

See also
List of Carex species

References

flavocuspis
Taxa named by Adrien René Franchet
Taxa named by Ludovic Savatier
Plants described in 1878
Flora of Japan
Flora of China
Flora of the Kuril Islands
Flora of Kamchatka Krai
Flora of Sakhalin